Francis Hendricks (November 23, 1834 – June 9, 1920) was an American merchant, banker and politician from New York.

Life
Hendricks was born on November 23, 1834 in Kingston, Ulster County, New York

He attended the common schools and The Albany Academy. Then he engaged in the sale of photographic supplies in Syracuse from 1860 to 1916.

He served as a member of the Board of Fire Commissioners of Syracuse from 1877 to 1878; and was Mayor of Syracuse from 1880 to 1881.

He was a member of the New York State Assembly (Onondaga Co., 2nd D.) in 1884 and 1885. He was a member of the New York State Senate (25th D.) from 1886 to 1891, sitting in the 109th, 110th, 111th, 112th, 113th and 114th New York State Legislatures.

From September 28, 1891, to July 1893, Hendricks held the office of Collector of the Port of New York. He was also President of the State Bank of Syracuse. Governor Theodore Roosevelt appointed him as Superintendent of Insurance in February 1900, a post he held until May 1906.

In 1918, the veteran Hendricks lost the support of his ward and town leaders in the midst of the prohibition debate. After his defeat, Hendricks said he had "no desire to lead an organisation which has become the tool of the saloons."

He died on June 9, 1920, "after an illness of several weeks" in Syracuse, Onondaga County, New York.

Legacy 

Childless, in his will Hendricks left $500,000 to Syracuse University to build a chapel in memory of his wife, Eliza Jane. Today, Hendricks Memorial Chapel is a registered historic landmark on the university's campus.

References

Sources
 The New York Red Book compiled by Edgar L. Murlin (published by James B. Lyon, Albany NY, 1897; pg. 403 and 503f)
 Biographical sketches of the members of the Legislature in The Evening Journal Almanac] (1887)

1834 births
1920 deaths
Republican Party New York (state) state senators
Republican Party members of the New York State Assembly
Politicians from Kingston, New York
Mayors of Syracuse, New York
Collectors of the Port of New York
Syracuse University trustees
Burials at Oakwood Cemetery (Syracuse, New York)
The Albany Academy alumni